Presidency University, Kolkata (formerly known as Presidency College, Kolkata) is a second major public state aided research university located in College Street, Kolkata. Considered as one of the best colleges when Presidency College was affiliated to University of Calcutta. Established in 1817, it is the oldest college in India (in Asia as well ). It was formerly known as Hindu College and then Presidency College and now Presidency University.

 The institution was elevated to university status in 2010 after functioning as a top constituent college of the University of Calcutta for about 193 years. The university had its bicentenary celebrations in 2017.

In its first cycle as a university, Presidency received A grade with a score of 3.04/4.00 by the NAAC. Presidency has been recognized as an "Institute of National Eminence" by the UGC. It appeared in the inaugural list of top 50 institutions of NIRF rankings in 2016. However, NIRF rankings in 2017 and 2018 excluded universities like Presidency University which taught only science and humanities but not engineering, commerce, agriculture etc.

History

With the creation of the Supreme Court of Calcutta in 1773 many Hindus of Bengal showed an eager interest in learning the English language. David Hare, in collaboration with Raja Radhakanta Deb had already taken steps to introduce English language education in Bengal. Babu Buddinath Mukherjee advanced the introduction of English as a medium of instruction further by enlisting the support of Sir Edward Hyde East, Chief Justice of the Supreme Court of Fort William, who called a meeting of 'European and Hindu Gentlemen' at his house in May 1816. The purpose of the meeting was to "discuss the proposal to establish an institution for giving a liberal education to the children of the members of the Hindu Community". The proposal was received with unanimous approbation and a donation of over Rs. 100, 000 was promised for setting up the new college. Raja Ram Mohan Roy showed full support for the scheme, but chose not to come out in support of the proposal publicly for fear of "alarming the prejudices of his orthodox countrymen and thus marring the whole idea".

The college was formally opened on Monday, 20 January 1817 with 20 'scholars'. The foundation committee of the college, which oversaw its establishment, was headed by Raja Ram Mohan Roy. The control of the institution was vested in a body of two Governors and four Directors. The first Governors of the college were Maharaja Tejchandra Bahadur of Burdwan and Gopee Mohan Thakoor. The first Directors were Gopi Mohun Deb of Sobhabazar, Joykissen Sinha, Radha Madhab Banerjee, and Gunganarain Doss. Buddinath Mukherjee was appointed as the first Secretary of the college. The newly established college  admitted Hindu students only from affluent and upper caste families.

At first, the classes were held in a house belonging to Gorachand Bysack of Garanhatta (later renamed 304, Chitpore Road), which was rented by the college. In January 1818 the college moved to 'Feringhi Kamal Bose's house' which was located nearby in Chitpore. From Chitpore, the college moved to Bowbazar and later to the building that now houses the Sanskrit College on College Street.

Departments and Courses

1) Bengali
2) English
3) Mathematics
4) Statistics
5) History
6) Geography
7) Geology
8) Life Science
9) Physics
10) Chemistry
11) Economy
12) Sociology
13) Political Science
14) Philosophy
15) Performing Arts
16) Biotechnology
17) Hindi

 Institute of Health Sciences
 School of Astrophysics

Transformation to university

In 1972, an unsigned article was released by the faculty members of the college demanding that the college be given full university status. It is an open secret that the author of the article was Dipak Banerjee, the legendary economics professor of the college. The state government, then under the chief ministership of Siddhartha Shankar Ray, showed the willingness to listen to the demands of the faculty members, but it was still too early to grant full autonomy to the college. In 2007, the state government, under the chief ministership of Buddhadeb Bhattacharya and Higher Education ministership of Sudarshan Raychaudhuri, appointed a seven-member committee, under the chairmanship of Chittatosh Mookerjee. The other members of the committee included Ashes Prasad Mitra, Barun De, Bimal Jalan and Subimal Sen, to look into the possibility of upgrading the status of the college. The report of the committee suggested that the state government, while granting partial autonomy to the college, should first create a large corpus grant before granting university status to the college. It also recommended the creation of more professorships, lecturerships and scholarships for meritorious students, thus strengthening the college.

In 2009, the Governing Body of the college unanimously adopted the proposal that the college should be given full university status. On 16 December 2009, the Government of West Bengal tabled a bill in the Bidhan Sabha titled the Presidency University Act, 2009, in which the West Bengal Legislative Assembly granted full university status to the college. The bill stated that once the college becomes a full state-aided university it will be renamed Presidency University.

The new logo of the Presidency University has been created by Sabyasachi Dutta (সব্যসাচী দত্ত) as reported in a letter to the Editor of Anandabazar Patrika on 1 April 2013.

On 19 March 2010, the West Bengal Government passed the Presidency University Bill, 2009 in the State Legislative Assembly. On 7 July 2010, the Governor of West Bengal, M K Narayanan gave his assent to the Presidency University Bill. On 23 July 2010, the Government of West Bengal published the gazette notification completing all the legal formalities for presidency to become a full university. Amiya Bagchi was given the responsibility of chairing a committee set up to select and appoint the first vice-chancellor of the university. 
Amita Chatterjee, a retired professor of philosophy at Jadavpur University, was appointed as the first Vice-Chancellor of Presidency University on 5 October 2010.

In 2011, Higher Education Minister Bratya Basu suggested that a mentor group, along the lines of the Nalanda mentor group, would be formed to oversee the work of the university. At the beginning of June 2011, the chief minister of West Bengal, Mamata Banerjee, announced that a committee would be formed with Amartya Sen as its chief mentor and Harvard-based Sugata Bose as its chairman to oversee the running of the college and perform the task of appointing all its officials and faculty members. The Presidency mentor group
 also includes as its members  2019 Economics Nobel Prize winner Abhijit Banerjee, Ashoke Sen, Sabyasachi Bhattacharya, Nayanjot Lahiri, Himadri Pakrashi, Rahul Mukerjee and Isher Judge Ahluwalia, Swapan Kumar Chakravorty. Sukanta Chaudhuri resigned from the committee in 2012.

In October 2011, Malabika Sarkar, formerly Professor of English at Jadavpur University, was appointed Vice-Chancellor of Presidency University. During her term as Vice-Chancellor more than 150 faculty members - Presidency University's first faculty - were recruited and joined. The university's first officers and the first group of non-teaching staff were also recruited. A new logo was created by an alumnus, infrastructural projects were initiated and the Presidency University Vice-Chancellor's Fund for Excellence was set up. In December 2012, UGC recognized Presidency University as an Institution of National Eminence. MOUs for international collaboration with Trinity College, Dublin; Groningen University, Netherlands; and D'Etudes Politiques de Paris (Sciences Po, Paris) were signed. Presidency University's first convocation was held on 22 August 2013 and the foundation stone for Presidency's second campus at Rajarhat was unveiled by Chief Minister Mamata Banerjee on 6 February 2014. Presidency's First Statutes were completed. Sarkar's tenure as Vice-Chancellor ended in May 2014.

After Sarkar's tenure expired, a new search committee was built by the state government and the Chancellor, i. e. Governor of West Bengal. The search committee published a list of three Professors and sent it to the Chancellor. The first person in the list Sabyasachi Bhattacharya refused to join the administration and chose to teach at Presidency as the Acharya Jagadish Chandra Bose Distinguished Chair Professor in the Department of Physics. Ultimately the position went to Anuradha Lohia, an alumnus of Presidency College, who was a senior professor at Bose Institute in Kolkata. Lohia had supervised a number of students for their Ph.D. research over many years in Bose Institute, affiliated for its Ph.D. programme with the University of Calcutta.

The entrance of the campus is marked with a small guardhouse on the left. On the wall of the guard room is a plaque dedicated to durwan (guard) Ram Eqbal Singh, who died defending the institute from rioters.

Organisation structure

Like every state university in West Bengal, Presidency University is headed by the Chancellor. The Governor of West Bengal is the Chancellor of every state university. La. Ganesan is presently incumbent in this post.

The Vice-chancellor is the academic and administrative head of the institution. The post of the Vice-chancellor replaced that of the Principal after Presidency College received University status. Professor Anuradha Lohia is the first permanent vice-chancellor of the institution. The current Registrar of the university is Dr. Debajyoti Konar.

In academics, the university consists of two faculties – the Faculty of Natural and Mathematical sciences and the Faculty of Humanities and Social Sciences. Both Faculties are headed by deans. A total of 16 departments function under the university. They are: Bengali, English, Hindi, History, Performing Arts, Philosophy, Political Science, Sociology, Life Sciences, Chemistry, Economics, Geography, Geology, Mathematics, Physics and Statistics.

The Controller of Examinations, the Chief Librarian, the Finance Officer and the Dean of Students are other important office holders of the university.

The university is guided by a mentor group. The Mentor Group is chaired by Sugata Bose, the Gardiner Professor of Oceanic History and Affairs at Harvard University. Nobel Laureate and economist Amartya Sen serves as the Advisor to the chair.

Politics 
Presidency University is a politically active campus. The Independents' Consolidation was won all but five students union elections since its formation in 1989. The SFI won the union elections after a 10-year drought in 2019. Other political outfits in the campus include the All India Students Association and the All India Trinamool Student Congress.

Principals of Presidency College

Vice Chancellors of Presidency University

Admission
Admission to this institution for undergraduate and postgraduate courses is currently granted on the basis of marks secured in admission tests, PUBDET and PUMDET respectively. Both PUBDET and PUMDET are organised by West Bengal Joint Entrance Examinations Board.

Notable alumni

Presidency University has many notable alumni. They include at least four heads of states, five Chief Ministers of West Bengal, four Chief Justices of India, one Governor of RBI, one Oscar winner, multiple Padma awardees, at least six Sahitya Akademi Awardes, Several national award winning Film Directors, at least 15 Shanti Swarup Bhatnagar laureates, one Breakthrough Prize winner,  two Nobel laureates, one Kyoto Prize winner, multiple academics serving as professors in premier Universities of the world and several civil servants serving in senior capacities.

References

External links
 
 

 
19th century in Kolkata
Academic institutions associated with the Bengal Renaissance
Educational institutions established in 1817
1817 establishments in British India
Universities in Kolkata
Hindu universities and colleges